The UCI Junior Nations' Cup is an annual, season-long competition for junior (age 17/18) road cyclists. It was created by the Union Cycliste Internationale in 2008 to aid in the development of young riders.

Races 
Races highlighted in yellow are no longer part of the nations cup.

References 

Junior Nations Cup
Men's road cycling
Recurring sporting events established in 2008